Women's freestyle 60 kg competition at the 2015 European Games in Baku, Azerbaijan, took place on 15 June at the Heydar Aliyev Arena.

Schedule
All times are Azerbaijan Summer Time (UTC+05:00)

Results 
Legend
F — Won by fall

Repechage

References

External links

Wrestling at the 2015 European Games
Euro